Trio Fascination: Edition One is an album by the American jazz saxophonist Joe Lovano, recorded in September 1997 and released the following year on the Blue Note label.

Reception
The AllMusic review by Alex Henderson stated: "Heard on tenor, alto and soprano, the saxophonist never fails to command our attention on this consistently heartfelt and captivating release".

Track listing
All compositions by Joe Lovano except as indicated
 "New York Fascination" - 3:06
 "Sanctuary Park" - 6:44
 "Eternal Joy" - 7:35
 "Ghost of a Chance" (Victor Young, Ned Washington, Bing Crosby) - 4:54
 "Studio Rivbea" - 7:10
 "Cymbalism" - 4:57
 "Impressionistic" - 9:34
 "Villa Paradisco" - 7:13
 "4 on the Floor" - 5:11
 "Days of Yore" - 9:27

Personnel
Joe Lovano – tenor, soprano, alto, and straight alto  saxophone, alto clarinet
Dave Holland – bass
Elvin Jones – drums

References

External links
 

Blue Note Records albums
Joe Lovano albums
1998 albums